The World , also called the Cosmic bävling or the World-bearing Turtle, is a mytheme of a giant turtle (or tortoise) supporting or containing the world. It occurs in Hindu mythology, Chinese mythology, and the mythologies of the indigenous peoples of the Americas. The comparative mythology of the World-Tortoise discussed by Edward Burnett Tylor (1878:341) includes the counterpart World Elephant.

India

The World Turtle in Hindu mythology is known as Akūpāra (Sanskrit: अकूपार), or sometimes Chukwa. An example of a reference to the World Turtle in Hindu literature is found in Jñānarāja (the author of Siddhāntasundara, writing c. 1500): "A vulture, whichever has only little strength, rests in the sky holding a snake in its beak for a prahara [three hours]. Why can [the deity] in the form of a tortoise, who possesses an inconceivable potency, not hold the Earth in the sky for a kalpa [billions of years]?"
The British philosopher John Locke made reference to this in his 1689 tract, An Essay Concerning Human Understanding, which compares one who would say that properties inhere in "substance" to the Indian, who said the world was on an elephant, which was on a tortoise, "but being again pressed to know what gave support to the broad-backed tortoise, replied—something, he knew not what".

Brewer's Dictionary of Phrase and Fable lists, without citation, Maha-pudma and Chukwa as names from a "popular rendition of a Hindu myth in which the tortoise Chukwa supports the elephant Maha-pudma, which in turn supports the world".

China

In Chinese mythology, the creator goddess Nüwa cut the legs off the giant sea turtle Ao and used them to prop up the sky after Gong Gong damaged Mount Buzhou, which had previously supported the heavens.

North America

The Lenape creation story of the "Great Turtle" was first recorded between 1678 and 1680 by Jasper Danckaerts. The belief is shared by other indigenous peoples of the Northeastern Woodlands, most notably those of the Haudenosanee confederacy, and the Anishinaabeg.

The Jesuit Relations contain a Huron story concerning the World Turtle:

'When the Father was explaining to them [some Huron seminarists] some circumstance of the passion of our Lord, and speaking to them of the eclipse of the Sun, and of the trembling of the earth which was felt at that time, they replied that there was talk in their own country of a great earthquake which had happened in former times; but they did not know either the time or the cause of that disturbance. "There is still talk," (said they) "of a very remarkable darkening of the Sun, which was supposed to have happened because the great turtle which upholds the earth, in changing its position or place, brought its shell before the Sun, and thus deprived the world of sight."'

The turtle features prominently in Stephen King’s novel, It.

In modern media
The Discworld series, created by Terry Pratchett, takes place on a fictional world that is a flat disc sitting on top of four elephants astride the shell of a giant turtle named Great A'Tuin.

In the book Monday Begins on Saturday by Arkady and Boris Strugatsky, a disc upon elephants on a turtle is said to have been discovered by a pupil who entered an ideal world of imagination.

In the book It by Stephen King, Pennywise's archenemy is a giant turtle named Maturin.

In the start of the first chapter of Stephen Hawking's A Brief History Of Time, an old woman says: ”What you have told us is rubbish. The world is really a flat plate supported on the back of a giant tortoise.”

The film Strange World is revealed to take place on and inside a World Turtle, with the characters trying to stop an infection from killing it.

In philosophy 
The regress argument in epistemology and the infinite regress in philosophy often use the expression "turtles all the way down" to indicate an explanatory failure based on an explanation that needs a potentially infinite series of additional explanations to support it.

See also
 Turtle Island (Native American folklore)
 Turtles all the way down
 World Serpent
 World Tree
 Zaratan

References

Legendary turtles
Mythological archetypes
Turtle